Tetragonoderus perrieri is a species of beetle in the family Carabidae. It was described by Fairmaire in 1900.

References

perrieri
Beetles described in 1900